Alan Ridley (1910–1993) was an Australian rugby league footballer who played in the 1920s and 1930s. An Australian international and New South Wales interstate representative winger, he played club football for Sydney's Western Suburbs, with whom he won the 1934 NSWRFL Premiership.

Playing career
He started his career playing for the Acton Rovers of the Canberra competition. Whilst playing for the Queanbeyan "Blues", he was selected to go on the 1929–30 Kangaroo tour of Great Britain. He was the 1932 NSWRFL season's top try scorer with 18 tries. Ridley was selected to go on the 1933–34 Kangaroo tour of Great Britain He scored a record 6 tries in a match for the Western Suburbs Magpies in 1934.

Post playing
Ridley moved to Orange, New South Wales at the end of his rugby league career and later became Mayor of the town. He died there in 1993. He was voted in the Wests Tigers Team of the Century and the Western Suburbs Magpies Team of the Century.

References

1910 births
1993 deaths
Australian rugby league players
Western Suburbs Magpies players
New South Wales rugby league team players
City New South Wales rugby league team players
Country New South Wales rugby league team players
Australia national rugby league team players
Rugby league players from New South Wales
Rugby league wingers